Edina Füsti (born 24 June 1982 in Ózd) is a female Hungarian race walker. She is a six-time national champion (2002–2007) for the 20 km race walk. Fusti made her official debut for the 2004 Summer Olympics in Athens, where she placed forty-fourth in the women's 20 km race walk, with a time of 1:39:45.

At the 2008 Summer Olympics in Beijing, Fusti competed for the second time in the 20 km race walk. Despite the tumultuous weather, she was able to finish and complete the race in thirty-ninth place by nearly eleven seconds behind El Salvador's Veronica Colindres, with her fastest possible time of 1:37:03.

Fusti is also a member of Tatabányai SC, being coached and trained by Antal Kiss.

References

External links

NBC Olympics Profile

1982 births
Living people
Hungarian female racewalkers
Olympic athletes of Hungary
Athletes (track and field) at the 2004 Summer Olympics
Athletes (track and field) at the 2008 Summer Olympics
People from Ózd
Sportspeople from Borsod-Abaúj-Zemplén County